Thames was launched in New York in 1798, probably under another name. Bebby & Co., of Liverpool, acquired her circa 1807. An American privateer captured Thames in January 1813 as Thames was sailing back to Liverpool from Africa.

Career
Thames first appeared in Lloyd's Register (LR) in 1807.

Captain Francis Toole acquired a letter of marque on 28 March 1809.

Fate
The United States privateer Yankee captured Thames, Toole, master, in December 1812 or January 1813 off the coast of Africa. Thames was returning to Liverpool from Africa. Yankee landed Toole at Pernambuco in February. Thames arrived at Boston on 8 April.

LR for 1814 carried the annotation "capt." by her name.

Yankee, Captain Oliver Wilson, was on her second (of five cruises). She captured Thames on 10 January 1813 off Annabona. Thames was returning to Liverpool from Mayjumba with a cargo of 240 tons of camwood, some dry goods, and some ivory. Wilson estimated the value of vessel and cargo at $25,000. Another report put the value of the cargo at $40,000. A prize crew brought Thames safely into Boston.

Citations

References
 
 

1798 ships
Ships built in the United States
Age of Sail merchant ships of England
Captured ships